Manso Nkwanta is one of the constituencies represented in the Parliament of Ghana. It elects one Member of Parliament (MP) by the first past the post system of election. Manso Nkwanta is located in the Amansie West District of the Ashanti Region of Ghana.

Boundaries 
The seat is located within the Amansie West District of the Ashanti Region of Ghana.

Members of Parliament

Elections

See also 
 List of Ghana Parliament constituencies
 List of political parties in Ghana

References 

Parliamentary constituencies in the Ashanti Region